The House of Lords is the upper house of the Parliament of the United Kingdom. See also Chamber of Peers (disambiguation).

House of Lords may also refer to:

Upper houses 

 Irish House of Lords, the upper house of the former Parliament of Ireland in 1297–1800
 Chamber of Peers (France), the upper house of the Kingdom of France, 1814–1848.
 Prussian House of Lords (1850–1918), the upper house of the Kingdom of Prussia
 House of Lords (Austria), the upper house of the Imperial Council of the Austro-Hungarian Empire, 1867–1918
 House of Nobility (Sweden), the house of the Swedish nobility
 House of Magnates in Hungary, which functioned as the House of Lords
 Cromwell's House of Lords (1658–1659) during the final years of the Protectorate

Other 

 The House of Lords (restaurant), Dutch former Michelin starred restaurant
 House of Lords (Lords of the Underground album), 2007
 House of Lords (band), an American rock band
 House of Lords (House of Lords album), 1988
 "House of Lords", or Thomas Dartnall, bass player for British band Young Knives
 House of Lords, official whisky of the British House of Lords, distilled by Edradour in Scotland
 House of Lords gin, made by Booth's
House of Lords, the former highest court in the United Kingdom, until superseded by the Supreme Court.

See also

 Chamber of Peers (disambiguation)
 The House of the Lord (book) a 1912 book by James E. Talmage about LDS temples
 house of the lord
 
 Lord House (disambiguation)
 House (disambiguation)
 Lords (disambiguation)
 Lord (disambiguation)